The Mackinac Island Town Crier is a weekly, seasonal newspaper that covers events in and around Mackinac Island in the U.S. state of Michigan.  The Town Crier has been owned by the family of Wesley H. Maurer Sr. since 1957, making it one of Michigan's oldest family-owned and -operated newspapers.  As of 2019, the Town Crier was published 22 times a year, with weekly issues in the summer and periodic issues in the late fall, winter, and early spring. It has a circulation of 2,700.

References

External links
Official web page

Newspapers published in Michigan
Mackinac Island